Jimilian Ismaili (born 22 August 1994) is a Danish singer.

Life and career 

Ismaili's father was a well-known folk musician in Albania. The family left the country and lived temporarily in Belgium, until they applied for political asylum in Denmark. They lived in Center Sandholm, a receiving center for asylum seekers for a while before legally settling in Denmark in 2000. In 2006, Jimilian Ismaili competed in the Børne MGP (Danish Children's Melodi Grand Prix) under the name "Lil 'G" with "Penge". After the MGP, Jimilian continued to release music online, becoming popular through postings including "Elsker", "Virus", "Vibration", "Finde dit smil igen" and "Tættere på". Jimilian gained attention by featuring on "Ghetto" by Mido (real name Mohammed Zaghmout) and the follow-up "Ghetto Pt. 2" featuring Jimilian and Enrico Blak. He was eventually signed to Flexmusic, as was Mido. Jimilian's first charting single was "Hjerteslag" featuring Poeten entered Tracklisten, which peaked at number 20 on the official Danish Singles Chart in July 2012.

Discography

Albums

Singles

As lead artist

As featured artist

Promotional singles

References 

1994 births
Living people
Danish people of Albanian descent
21st-century Danish male  singers